Oakdale Township is one of twenty-four townships in Antelope County, Nebraska, United States. The population was estimated to be 414 according to the US Census Bureau.

The village of Oakdale lies within the township.

See also
County government in Nebraska

References

External links
City-Data.com

Townships in Antelope County, Nebraska
Townships in Nebraska